Gardner Cadwalader (born July 29, 1948) is an American rower. He competed in the men's coxed four event at the 1968 Summer Olympics. He subsequently rowed in the winning Cambridge  Boat Race crew in 1972.

References

External links
 

1948 births
Living people
American male rowers
Olympic rowers of the United States
Rowers at the 1968 Summer Olympics
Rowers from Philadelphia
Pan American Games medalists in rowing
Pan American Games gold medalists for the United States
Rowers at the 1967 Pan American Games
20th-century American people